The North Wales Coast League was a North Walian association football league that existed from 1893 until 1921. After the Welsh Senior League, which started in 1890, it was the second association football league formed in North Wales. There was an attempt to restart the league in 1930, which failed, followed by another restart in 1933, which lasted for two seasons. Seven teams from across the North Wales coast contested in the first season, with the number of clubs increasing to 26 in 1920, playing over two divisions.

History

Background

Formation

Welsh National League
In 1921 the league was absorbed into the Welsh National League (North).

North Wales Football Combination
As well as the failed attempt to restart the league in the 1930-31 season, the North Wales Football Combination was formed in the same season, then renamed North Wales Coast League for the 1933-34 season, for two seasons. Disbanded due to the formation of the Welsh League North.

Champions

1905–21

Division One

Division Two

1933–35

Former members of the North Wales Coast League

Notes

 Bangor City.

References

 
North Wales Coast League
1893 establishments in Wales
1921 disestablishments in Wales
Sports leagues established in 1893
Sports leagues established in 1933
Sports leagues disestablished in 1921
Sports leagues disestablished in 1935